The men's 1500 metres at the 2019 World Athletics Championships was held at the Khalifa International Stadium in Doha from 3 to 6 October 2019.

Summary
In modern history, championship races are slow strategic affairs where fast athletes are unwilling to sacrifice their medals by running a fast pace.  Fast races happen in more controlled environments with planned pace setters at major European meets.

Timothy Cheruiyot didn't get the memo.  From the gun, Cheruiyot and his Kenyan teammate Ronald Kwemoi went out hard, breaking away by 2 metres in the first 200.  The guys who usually drop to the back realized this was serious and started scrambling to the front.  Olympic gold medalist Matthew Centrowitz Jr. and silver medalist Taoufik Makhloufi formed a chase group 5 metres back, Jakob Ingebrigtsen leading the peloton another 5 metres back.  Over the next lap, the chasers fell back to the peloton, the breakaway now 10 metres.  Cheruiyot kept up the pressure, over the next half lap, Kwemoi fell off his back.  By the bell, Kwemoi was back to the peloton, again led by Makhloufi.  The next on the front were Ingebrigtsen and Josh Kerr.  It appeared a more mature 23 year old Cheruiyot had learned from his fast early pace at the 2015 World Relays where he fell apart on the last lap.  Here, there was no sign of letting up.  Down the backstretch, coming from 9th place, Marcin Lewandowski ran around the outside of the pack, hitting Makhloufi's shoulder by the beginning of the final turn.  The other competitors were already fully extended and couldn't make any dramatic moves.  Cheruiyot crossed the finish line 17 metres ahead of Makhloufi.  Lewandowski was able to stay a metre behind Makhloufi, trying to nudge ahead in vain at the finish line.  The others fell off the back with only Ingebrigtsen remaining two metres behind Lewandowski and Jake Wightman yet another metre back.

While 3:29.26 was "only" the 57th best performance ever, it was the third fastest Olympic or World Championship performance, only bettered by the 1999 championships when the number 2 miler ever, Noah Ngeny chased world record holder Hicham El Guerrouj to the championship record, and unlike that race, this was done off the front, solo.

Records
Before the competition records were as follows:

The following records were set at the competition:

Qualification standard
The standard to qualify automatically for entry was 3:36.00 or 3:53.10 for the mile.

Schedule
The event schedule, in local time (UTC+3), was as follows:

Results

Heats
The first six in each heat (Q) and the next six fastest (q) qualified for the semi-finals.

Semi-finals
The first five in each heat (Q) and the next two fastest (q) qualified for the final.

Final
The final was started on 6 October at 19:40.

References

1500
1500 metres at the World Athletics Championships